Route 360 is a  long east–west secondary highway in the northeast portion of New Brunswick, Canada.

The route's eastern terminus is southwest of the community of Blue Mountain Settlement in the Brunswick Mines area close to Pabineau Lake. The road travels southeast to the community of Middle Landing and then crosses the Nepisiguit River. The route then continues through mostly treed area crossing a railway track and then intersecting with Route 8 before continuing to the community Allardville at the intersection of Route 134 and Route 160.

Intersecting routes
Route 8

See also

References

360
360